Death Watch is a 1980 science fiction film directed by Bertrand Tavernier. It is based on the 1973 novel The Unsleeping Eye by David G. Compton. The film was entered into the 30th Berlin International Film Festival. The film had 1,013,842 admissions in France and was the 35th most attended film of the year.

Plot
The film is set in a near-future where death from illness has become rare. When Katherine Mortenhoe is diagnosed as having an incurable disease, she becomes a celebrity and is besieged by journalists. Vincent Ferriman, top executive at the television company NTV, offers her a large sum of money if she will allow her last days to be filmed and made into a reality television show called “Death Watch”. They have already secretly recorded her being told her diagnosis, as her doctor is colluding with them and has given her what are allegedly painkillers but will in fact make her increasingly ill. She accepts 300,000 pounds cash up front and, after giving the money to her husband, goes on the run in disguise. At a night shelter for down-and-outs she is found by Roddy.

The audience knows – but she does not – that Roddy is a senior NTV cameraman who has undergone an experimental implant of cameras and transmitters behind his eyes, so that everything he sees is fed back to NTV, who edit it for their reality show. Roddy has done this mainly for money to give his estranged wife and their son. A side-effect is that he will go blind if he experiences more than a short period of darkness, so he has to stay awake by shining a small flashlight on his eyes at night.

As Katherine is liable to be recognised in the city, she asks Roddy to take her far away into open country. In fact she is heading for the home of her first husband Gerald, who she wants to see before she dies. To prepare for meeting him, she asks Roddy to go into a town and buy her some make-up. Dropping into a bar, he sees the primetime screening of “Death Watch” and on his way back to their hide-out has an emotional breakdown, losing his flashlight. Katherine comes to look for him and finds the flashlight, but he has already gone blind. She guesses, and he admits, who he is and what he is doing.

As the feed to NTV has ended, Vincent takes off in a helicopter with a film crew to find the pair, who successfully evade them and reach Gerald's house. He knows about the TV show and, though deeply sad for Katherine, is glad she has come to him. Vincent telephones Gerald to say that, if she arrives, she is not dying and must stop taking the medicine. But Katherine has reached the end of the road: despite Gerald's pleas, she takes all the remaining pills and dies. When Vincent's helicopter arrives, it includes Roddy's wife, who takes care of her traumatised blind husband. Gerald promises to kill Vincent if he does not fly away immediately.

Filming
Much of the filming took place in and around Glasgow, including: Glasgow Necropolis, Glasgow Cathedral, the former Queen's Dock on the River Clyde and the Glasgow City Chambers.  The film is dedicated to deceased film director Jacques Tourneur.

Home media
In 2012 Shout! Factory released the film on Blu-ray in Region 1, whilst Park Circus handled the Region 2 release.

Cast
 Romy Schneider as Katherine Mortenhoe
 Harvey Keitel as Roddy
 Harry Dean Stanton as Vincent Ferriman
 Thérèse Liotard as Tracey
 Max von Sydow as Gerald Mortenhoe
 Caroline Langrishe as Girl In The Bar
 William Russell as Dr. Mason
 Vadim Glowna as Harry Graves
 Bernhard Wicki as Katherine's Father 
 Robbie Coltrane as Limousine Driver

See also
List of films featuring surveillance

References

External links

 

1980 films
1980s science fiction films
1980s dystopian films
French science fiction films
West German films
1980s French-language films
Films directed by Bertrand Tavernier
Films about death
Films about diseases
Films about television
Dystopian films
Films based on British novels
Films shot in Glasgow
English-language French films
English-language German films
1980s French films